El Calafate, also known as Calafate, is a city in Patagonia, Argentina. The name of the city is derived from a little bush with yellow flowers and dark blue berries that is very common in Patagonia: the calafate (Berberis buxifolia); the word comes from the word , which is Spanish for 'caulk'.

El Calafate is an important tourist destination as the hub to visit different parts of the Los Glaciares National Park, including Perito Moreno Glacier, Cerro Chaltén, and Cerro Torre.

History 

The history of El Calafate began in the first decades of the twentieth century. Originally, it was simply a sheltering place for wool traders. The town was officially founded in 1927 by the government of Argentina to promote settlement, but it was the creation of nearby Perito Moreno National Park in 1937 that sparked growth and the building of better road access.

Transport 
The 220 kilometers separating Calafate from El Chaltén on the other side of the Lake Argentino in the national park are paved, as well as the 315 kilometres to Río Gallegos. Other distances are: to Bariloche 1400 km ; to Esquel 1108 km (some dirt road); Comodoro Rivadavia 959 km; Puerto Madryn 1388 km; Buenos Aires 2727 km; Ushuaia 863 km.

The town is served by El Calafate International Airport  located some 20 km east of the village.

Population 
In the last census 6,143 permanent residents were counted. This represents a 20.1% increase compared with the 1991 census. However, due to the expansion of tourism, the population was estimated at over 28,000 people as of 2020.

Wildlife 
Flamingos are regularly visible from El Calafate congregating in the waters of Lago Argentino.

Climate
El Calafate experiences a cold semi-arid climate (Köppen BSk) with cool to warm, very dry summers and cool to cold, slightly wetter winters.
The city's extremes of cold and heat are moderated by the influence of Lago Argentino. The waterfront of the city is located on a large shallow bay that is often frozen in the winter, allowing residents to practice ice skating.

Attractions 
El Calafate is the location of the Glaciarium, a museum that focuses on ice and glaciers, especially in the Southern Patagonian Ice Field.

Interesting facts 
The most recent World Altitude Gliding record of 22,657 m (74,333 ft) was set near El Calafate on 2 September 2018 by Jim Payne and Tim Gardner in the new Perlan 2 glider (with pressurised cabin).

A previous gliding altitude record of 15,460 m (50,722 feet) was set near El Calafate on 30 August 2006 by Steve Fossett and Einar Enevoldson in their 'Perlan' high altitude research glider. This record has been certified by the Fédération Aéronautique Internationale.

The town was on the path of the total solar eclipse of July 11, 2010, occurring just before sunset.
El Calafate was featured in the Top Gear Patagonia Special, in which the presenters drove from Bariloche to Ushuaia.

References

Notes

External links 

 Elcalafate.gov.ar, Official government site 
 Glaciarium Website

Populated places in Santa Cruz Province, Argentina
Populated places established in 1927
Tourist attractions in Santa Cruz Province, Argentina
Calafate
Cities in Argentina
Argentina
Santa Cruz Province, Argentina